Dirk Ivens is a Belgian musician and performer in the industrial music genre.

Career
In 1978 he started as singer and guitar player in the punk band Slaughterhouse but left the group after one year to form the new band The Few. In 1980 he formed the electronic band Absolute Body Control, influenced by Suicide, DAF, and British artists like Fad Gadget. After going through various members, Absolute Body Control soon settled as a duo with Ivens and Eric van Wonterghem.

In 1985, Absolute Body Control joined forces with Marc Verhaeghen's band The Klinik and Sandy Nys' The Maniacs to form the "supergroup" Absolute Controlled Clinical Maniacs. The name was soon shortened to The Klinik; Nys left in 1986 and van Wonterghem in 1987 to work on their own bands, while Ivens remained a member until 1991, when he left to concentrate on his solo project Dive which had numerous releases the following 15 years.

Also in 1996, Dirk started Sonar together with Patrick Stevens, who left in 1998 to be replaced by long-time collaborator (and brother-in-law) Eric van Wonterghem. In 2003-2005 he rejoined Marc Verhaeghen in The Klinik for a few festival concerts, without releasing any new material.

Discography

Collaborations/split releases
Fuck, Rinse, Repeat / Burn digital Single with Jenn Vix (self released by Jenn Vix, 2013)
Go (Bring It) Back single-sided 12" with Agent Side Grinder (Kollaps Records, 2014)

External links 
Daft Records
Dirk Ivens at Discogs
Band page on Facebook

Year of birth missing (living people)
Living people
Belgian industrial musicians
Electronic body music musicians